Kiuwan is a software as a service (SaaS) platform providing end-to-end static application security testing. They provide services to a range of industries, but specialize in code security analysis for banking, finance, insurance and IT organizations.

History 
Kiuwan was initially founded in 2003 as a development operations consultancy  who provided services for organizations looking to enhance their development efficiency.  

 2007 the team released an On-Premise Quality Assurance (QA) tool, as a result of the collective experience gained from consulting
 2009 the team launched the Kiuwan brand, segmenting the business into both consulting and SaaS
 2014 realizing the weakness of an on-premises model, Kiuwan released a Hybrid Code QA tool and a solution to view results in the cloud
 2016 marked the release of the signature Kiuwan product: Code Security (SAST)
 2017 Kiuwan launched their Insights (SCA) product propelled by recognition from the Spanish government 
 2018 Idera, Inc. acquired Kiuwan to expand the reach of the software to North America

Support 
As a multi-technology tool, Kiuwan supports over 30 programming languages, such as: ABAP, C, C++, C#, Objective-C, COBOL, Java, JavaServer Pages (JSP), JavaScript, JCL, PHP, PL/SQL, Transact-SQL, SQL, Visual Basic, Visual Basic .NET, RPG, SQL*Forms, Android, or Hibernate.

External links 

Software metrics
Software quality
Software testing tools
Static program analysis tools